Yashodhar Manikya (d. 1623), also known as Jashodhar Manikya, was the Maharaja of Tripura from 1600 to 1618. His reign is considered to be the nadir of the kingdom's history, with the temporary overthrowing of the monarchy and the region's incorporation into the Mughal Empire.

Early reign
The son and heir of Rajdhar Manikya I, Yashodhar was not able to immediately claim the throne upon his father's death in 1600; the kingdom's nobles were hesitant in supporting his ascension due to the inauspicious horoscope at the time of his birth. He eventually took the throne after fighting off his kinsman Ishwar Manikya, who had claimed power in the meantime, as well as attempts by pretenders such as Dharma Manikya (supported by the rival Arakan Kingdom) and Virabhadra Manikya.

Like Rajdhar, Yashodhar was a devout ruler who continued the spread of Vaishnavism in the kingdom which had begun under the former's reign. As with his father, he had little interest in administration and warfare, resulting in the weakening of royal power and the decline of the army. However, there are records of some military campaigns during his reign. This included conflict with the Arakanese king Hussein Shah as well as raids against the Bhulua Kingdom, which ultimately resulted in the latter's destruction.

Mughal conquest
In 1618, Ibrahim Khan Fath-i-Jang, the Mughal governor of Bengal, launched a land and sea assault on Tripura, with the intention of incorporating the kingdom into Bengal. Alongside a formidable naval fleet, two land forces were dispatched, consisting of 1000 cavalry, 60,000 infantry and 200 war-elephants. The Tripura army was quickly overwhelmed, with the capital Udaipur being captured. Yashodhar, along with his wives, fled into the jungle but were soon taken captive and escorted to Dhaka.

Though he was offered the return of his throne on the condition of providing tribute to the Mughal emperor, Yashodhar refused. He was kept in Mughal custody for the remainder of his life, first being imprisoned in Varanasi and then in Mathura. It was there that he died in 1623, while meditating, at the age of 72. Tripura remained under the control of the Mughal empire until the ascension of Yashodhar's distant kinsman Kalyan Manikya in 1626.

References

Kings of Tripura
History of Tripura
Dethroned monarchs
1623 deaths